Saša Lazić (born 6 April 1996) is an Austrian football midfielder.

Career
Born in Vienna, Lazić played in youth teams of 1. Simmeringer SC, First Vienna, Rapid Wien and Serbian giants Red Star Belgrade. He made his senior debut with FK Loznica in the 2015–16 Serbian First League. Then in summer 2016 he joined Slovenian second tier side NK Brežice 1919, During winterbreak he returned to Austria and joined First Vienna. In summer 2017 he returned to Serbia and joined FK Rad, leaving them during winter-break to join FK Podrinje Janja playing in the First League of Republika Srpska, second tier of Bosnia and Herzegovina. After finishing his season with Podrinje, he returned to Austria and, after a short spell with SV Schwechat, he joined Wiener Sport-Club.

References

1996 births
Living people
Footballers from Vienna
Austrian footballers
Austrian expatriate footballers
Association football midfielders
FK Loznica players
Serbian First League players
NK Brežice 1919 players
First Vienna FC players
FK Rad players
FK Podrinje Janja players
Expatriate footballers in Bosnia and Herzegovina
Expatriate footballers in Slovenia
SV Schwechat players
Wiener Sport-Club players